Hakea eneabba is a shrub in the family, Proteaceae and endemic to an area along the west coast in the Mid West region of Western Australia.

Description
Smaller branches are either smooth or hairy. Leaves are smooth and rigid with a central vein the length of the leaf ending with a sharp point at the apex. The inflorescence consists of 14-18 chrome-yellow flowers appearing in leaf axils in upper branches.

Taxonomy and naming 
This species of Hakea was named after the vicinity of Eneabba where it grows. It was first formally described by the botanist Laurence Haegi in 1999 in the work  Flora of Australia by Haegi, William Robert Barker, Robyn Barker and  Annette Wilson.

Distribution and habitat
Grows in scattered areas in and around Eneabba between Geraldton in the north to Dandaragan in the south on deep sand in heathland. This ornamental species requires a well-drained site in full sun.

References

eneabba
Eudicots of Western Australia
Plants described in 1999